Jefferson National Forest in Montana was established by the U.S. Forest Service on July 1, 1908 with  from the consolidation of Little Belt, Highwood Mountains, Snowy Mountains and Little Rockies National Forests. On April 8, 1932 the entire forest was transferred to Lewis and Clark National Forest, the name surviving as the Jefferson Division of Lewis and Clark.

See also
 List of forests in Montana

References

External links
Lewis and Clark National Forest
Forest History Society
Forest History Society:Listing of the National Forests of the United States Text from Davis, Richard C., ed. Encyclopedia of American Forest and Conservation History. New York: Macmillan Publishing Company for the Forest History Society, 1983. Vol. II, pp. 743-788.

Former National Forests of Montana
1908 establishments in Montana
Protected areas established in 1908
1932 disestablishments in Montana
Protected areas disestablished in 1932